St. Luke's Church is located within the compound of the Chest Diseases Hospital at the southwest slope of Shankaracharya Hill in the Dalgate area of Srinagar in Jammu and Kashmir, India. It is the first Christian church in Kashmir.

The Gothic-style church was built in 1896 by British engineers. The foundation stone for the church was laid on 12 September 1896 by British brothers and missionary hospital doctors, Dr Arthur Neve and Dr Ernest Neve. It was transferred to the Government of Jammu and Kashmir in the 1960s. The church remained in use until 1986 when it was abandoned due to rising militancy in the region. In 2016, the local Christian community and priests approached the state administration to seek its renovation. However, the church had severe structural issues and required major restoration work before it could be reopened.

Restoration 
The Government of India had selected Srinagar as one of the cities to implement its Smart Cities Mission. As part of the mission, the Centre provided  for the restoration of St. Luke's Church. Renovation work began in April 2020 but faced delays due to the COVID-19 pandemic. It was completed just ahead of Christmas 2021.

The main restoration process involved the ceiling of the stone and brick masonry structure which was redone with the traditional Khatamband woodwork and flooring with "Devar" stones.

Rededicated 
Lieutenant Governor Manoj Sinha rededicated the church after extensive restoration work on 23 December 2021, and the first prayer service was held at St. Luke's Church since 1986.

References

Church of North India cathedrals
Churches in Jammu and Kashmir
Churches in Srinagar
19th-century churches in India
19th-century Anglican church buildings